The 1995 Tokyo Indoor Singles was a tennis tournament played on indoor carpet courts.

Goran Ivanišević was the defending champion, but lost in the quarterfinals this year

Michael Chang won the title, defeating Mark Philippoussis in the final, 6–3, 6–4.

Seeds

Draw

Finals

Top half

Section 1

Section 2

Bottom half

Section 3

Section 4

References

 Main Draw

1995 ATP Tour
Tokyo Indoor